Hussain Mohamed Hassan (born 20 February 1970) is a Kuwaiti judoka. He competed in the men's half-lightweight event at the 1992 Summer Olympics.

References

1970 births
Living people
Kuwaiti male judoka
Olympic judoka of Kuwait
Judoka at the 1992 Summer Olympics
Place of birth missing (living people)